State Route 299 (SR 299) is an east–west state highway in the state of California that runs across the northern part of the state. At , it is the third longest California state highway (after Route 1 and Route 99). Route 299 begins at US 101 at the northern edge of Arcata and continues in an easterly direction through to the Nevada state line. Between Arcata and Redding, Route 299 intersects with State Route 96, and is briefly co-signed with State Route 3. In Redding, it intersects with State Route 273, State Route 44, and Interstate 5. East of Redding, it intersects with State Route 89, and a section is co-signed with State Route 139 before reaching Alturas. It is then co-signed with U.S. Route 395 northeast of Alturas, and then runs east toward the border with Nevada. A ghost town, Vya, Nevada, can be reached via this route, which after the border becomes a dirt road, which was formerly Nevada State Route 8A. The segment of SR 299 between Arcata and Redding is the Trinity Scenic Byway, a National Forest Scenic Byway.

Route description
 

SR 299 begins in Arcata at a trumpet interchange with US 101 as a freeway. The route has another trumpet interchange with SR 200 after leaving the Arcata city limits and crossing the Mad River. The freeway ends in the city of Blue Lake as SR 299 continues east past the truck scales. SR 299 enters Six Rivers National Forest and intersects SR 96 at Willow Creek. Soon after this, SR 299 crosses into Trinity County and Trinity National Forest. Paralleling the Trinity River, SR 299 passes through Salyer (where there is a rest area), Hawkins Bar, Burnt Ranch, Del Loma, Big Bar, Helena, Junction City, and finally Weaverville.

In Weaverville, SR 299 runs concurrently with SR 3 southbound to Douglas City, where there is a rest area. SR 299 continues east away from the Trinity River into Shasta County, passing by the Whiskeytown-Shasta-Trinity National Recreation Area and through the towns of Tower House and Whiskeytown as well as Whiskeytown Lake. SR 299 continues along Eureka Way through the town of Shasta into the city of Redding. SR 299 then runs concurrently along SR 273 north and Market Street across the Sacramento River before turning east onto its own freeway and intersecting I-5. SR 299 remains a freeway for a few miles before leaving the Redding city limits and passing through the town of Bella Vista and into the foothills of the southern Cascade Range.

SR 299 continues through Ingot, Round Mountain, Montgomery Creek, Hillcrest (after the rest area), Burney, and Johnson Park. The highway intersects with SR 89 before continuing through Fall River Mills and McArthur, where there is an intersection with CR A19. SR 299 then crosses into Lassen County, where it passes through Nubieber and Bieber before intersecting CR A2. The highway crosses into Modoc County and passes through Adin, where it runs concurrently with SR 139 and passes through Modoc National Forest. The concurrency lasts for several miles before SR 299 turns east and enters the city of Alturas. SR 299 runs concurrently with US 395 before turning east again and passing through Cedarville, near the Cedarville Airport. SR 299 ends at the Nevada state line.

SR 299 is part of the California Freeway and Expressway System, and from US 101 to SR 3 and from SR 139 to the eastern junction with US 395 is part of the National Highway System, a network of highways that are considered essential to the country's economy, defense, and mobility by the Federal Highway Administration. Three sections of SR 299 are eligible for inclusion in the State Scenic Highway System: from US 101 to SR 96, from SR 3 to I-5, and from SR 89 to SR 139; however, none are officially designated as a scenic highway by the California Department of Transportation.

History

State Route 299, from the intersection with US 101 all the way to US 395 in Alturas, was U.S. Route 299 from 1934 to 1964.  This was a spur of US 99 running East and West from the junction in Redding, now signed as CA 273 at the intersection of Eureka Way and Market St.   The actual road has been realigned many times, mainly to make easier grades and curves through the mountains.  In many places, especially in Trinity County, the old roadway can be seen beside the new road, and there are even several bridges visible from the current 299 that seemingly connect nothing to nothing nowadays, one of which is an arch bridge from 1923.  In 1934, 299 was the original State Route 44.

Major intersections

See also

References

NevadaDOT state maps

External links

Historic endpoints of U.S. Highway 299
California @ AARoads.com - State Route 299
Caltrans: Route 299 highway conditions
California Highways: SR 299

299
National Forest Scenic Byways
299
State Route 299
State Route 299
State Route 299
State Route 299
State Route 299
Shasta-Trinity National Forest
Six Rivers National Forest